Anathallis brevipes is a species of orchid plant native to Guyana.

References 

brevipes
Flora of Guyana